Bom Jardim de Minas is a city of the state of Minas Gerais, Brazil.

The name means Good Garden of Minas (Gerais).

It is situated in the southern part of Minas Gerais and in the middle of the Mantiqueira Mountains, at 1,200 meters high, which gives the city a mild climate.

The only paved road that reaches Bom Jardim de Minas is the BR-267, which connects the city to the southern part of the State of Minas Gerais and the region of Juiz de Fora.

Population: 6,459 inhabitants.

It was founded in 1770 with the formation of a farm land in current city. When it came near the farm houses, became a parish and then the district with the installation of the chapel on May 2, 1856. And finally, in 1938, the district was upgrade to city, with two districts, headquarters and Taboão.

Currently, the city has been increasing in the festivities such as Carnival. An agricultural exhibition in May, and a feast in honour of Jesus Christ in August. Along with the natural attractions of waterfalls and mountain scenery these contribute to the tourism industry of the city.

History 
In 1770 Arriaga Manoel de Oliveira, accompanied by his wife and six children, founded the Colony of Campo Vermelho near the current city. They were attacked by a tribe of Indians who inhabited the region and during the attack one of his sons was killed. Manoel Arriaga, very saddened by the fact, turned away from the colony and settled on the banks of the Milho Branco stream where he set up a farm which in time became the city.

Years later, Manoel Arriaga was visited by the illustrious Captain Antonio Correia de Lacerda and his family. He joined with Manoel Arriaga in expanding the farm and beginning the cultivation of land on a large scale.

At the request of Captain Lacerda the chapel of Bom Jardim, today the old parish church, was erected in the village centre.

Some years later, with the union of families Arriaga and Lacerda, the farm received the name "Fazenda do Bom Jardim". The origin of the name was due to a well maintained garden near the farmhouse.

In 1856 the village of Senhor Bom Jesus do Bom Jardim was instituted by provincial Law No. 761 of May 2 as belonging to the municipality of Turvo.

The effect of State Law No. 843 of 7 September 1923 was to rename the District to "Bom Jardim" but continuing to belong to the municipality of Turvo. Soon after, under State Law No. 1160, the City of Turvo had its name changed to Andrelândia.
The Municipality with the name of Bom Jardim, was created by Decree-State Law No. 148 of December 17, 1938. It consisted of two districts: the headquarters, originally part of the Municipality of Andrelândia, and Taboão from the city of Rio Preto.
By Decree-State Law No. 1058 of 31 December 1943 the City of Bom Jardim changed its name to Bom Jardim de Minas and included the new district of Arantina, split off from the District Headquarters. In 1962 Arantina was emancipated and Bom Jardim de Minas reverted to having the two districts of Headquarters and Taboão.

Geography 
Located on the banks of the Rio Grande in the southern region of the state of Minas Gerais, and the Serra da Mantiqueira.

The relief of the municipality consists of plateaus, with an average elevation of 1,100 meters, however, this average decreases toward the Rio Grande, to form the lowland rain that is circumvented by the "sea of hills and mountains," with higher topographic level. The highest point is the Serra da Bandeira in Taboão at elevation of 1733 meters.

The region consists of many Taboão high elevation mountains with many water springs, which means that there are several waterfalls in the region. The headwaters of the Rio do Peixe, one of the largest rivers in the region, located in the hills district Taboão.

Climate 

The city has mesothermal highland tropical climate, with cold and dry winter rains and higher, taking into account the situation of latitude and elevation ranging from 990 m to 1733 m. According to regional averages, the winter is hardly unpleasant unless one or the other day, the coldest month, July, has averaged approximately 55 °F and 61 °F, daily maximum of 71 °F and 73 °F and minimum of 41 °F to 50 °F and may reach even with minimum absolute in Celsius Scale up to 0 °C (32 °C), and may even gear.

Mayors of Bom Jardim de Minas 
This list composes all the mayors of the city of Bom Jardim de Minas, with their respective years since the birth of the city in 1938.

 1. Americo Ferreira Pena - 1939 to 1946
 2. Joaquim A. Souza Correia - 1946 to 1948
 3. Assis Rodrigues da Silva - 1948 to 1951
 4. Geraldo Andrade - 1951 to 1955
 5. José Landim (1st term) - 1955 to 1959
 6. Octaviano Nardy Ribeiro (1st term) - 1959 to 1963
 7. José Landim (2nd term) - 1963 to 1967
 8. Altomare Orlando de Carvalho - 1967 to 1971
 9. Bougleux José de Andrade - 1971 to 1972
 10. Itacy Bougleux de Andrade - 1972 to 1973
 11. Dimas Abbud - 1973 to 1977
 12. Octaviano Nardy Ribeiro (2nd term) - 1977 to 1982
 13. Sebastiao Delgado de Almeida - 1983 to 1988
 14. Manoel Rodrigues - 1989 to 1992
 15. Valtencir de Paula Nunes (1st term) - 1993 to 1996
 16. Genivaldo Marques de Paula - 1997 to 2000
 17. Valtencir de Paula Nunes (2nd term) - 2001 to 2004
 18. Carlos Roberto Marques - 2005 to 2008
 19. Joaquim Laercio Rodrigues (1st term) - 2009 to 2012
 20. Joaquim Laercio Rodrigues (2nd term) - 2013 - 2017
 21. Sergio Martins ( Dragão ) 2018 - 2021
 22. Joaquim Laercio Rodrigues (3rd term) current

References

External links 
 Page of Bom Jardim de Minas's Alderman Assembly, in Portuguese
 Bom Jardim de Minas - Turism |Photos and curisity of town, in Portuguese
 Enciclopedia of Cities - IBGE, in Portuguese

Municipalities in Minas Gerais